Mutiny Up My Sleeve was the third album by Canadian rock band Max Webster. The record was released in 1978 in Canada by Anthem Records and in the United States and Europe by Capitol Records. The album was certified gold by the Canadian Recording Industry Association. 

Recording sessions began in late 1977 at Sounds Interchange with Terry Brown as co-producer, and resumed at Phase One Studios in early 1978 with Mike Tilka stepping in after Brown quit. The intro of "The Party" was recorded live at the Seneca College Field House in Toronto, Ontario on December 31, 1977, which was also Tilka's last gig with the band before being replaced by Dave Myles.

In 1988 when the band's back catalog was re-released on CD, the original album cover was amended to include the phrase "Featuring Kim Mitchell" to capitalize on the success of Mitchell's post-Max Webster solo career.

Track listing
All songs written by Kim Mitchell and Pye Dubois, except where indicated
Side one
 "Lip Service" – 4:02
 "Astonish Me" (Terry Watkinson) – 4:49
 "Let Your Man Fly" (Watkinson) – 2:46
 "Water Me Down" – 3:13
 "Distressed" – 4:12

Side two
 "The Party" – 4:46
 "Waterline" – 4:08
 "Hawaii" – 3:03
 "Beyond the Moon" – 6:17

Personnel
Max Webster
Kim Mitchell – guitars and vocals
Terry Watkinson – keyboards and vocals
Dave Myles – bass guitar
Gary McCracken – drums and percussion
Pye Dubois – lyrics

Additional musicians
Carla Jensen, Judy Donnelly – additional vocals on "Distressed" and "Hawaii"

Production
Mike Tilka – producer, mixing
Terry Brown – producer
Mark Wright – engineer, mixing
Mike Jones – engineer 
Hugh Syme – album design

References

1978 albums
Max Webster albums
Anthem Records albums
Capitol Records albums